Eurípedes Waldick Soriano (May 13, 1933 in Caetité – September 4, 2008 in Rio de Janeiro) was a Brazilian singer–songwriter, best known as a composer and singer of songs in the brega style.

Biography
Soriano was born in Bahia, where he lived and worked as a truck driver, prospector, and in manual labor until he was 25. He moved to São Paulo in 1959, where he began working at Rádio Nacional. His first album was issued in 1960, and his style of dramatic, sentimental songs became popular throughout Brazil. He went on to record dozens of albums and score many hits in his native country.

In 2005, Soriano was depicted in a documentary directed by Patrícia Pillar. It was titled Waldick - Sempre No Meu Coração (Waldick - Always In My Heart).

Soriano died of prostate cancer on September 4, 2008, at the age of 75.

Discography

References

External links 

1933 births
2008 deaths
Deaths from prostate cancer
Deaths from cancer in Rio de Janeiro (state)
People from Bahia
20th-century Brazilian male singers
20th-century Brazilian singers